[A→B] Life is the debut album by American rock band mewithoutYou. It was released on Tooth & Nail Records on June 18, 2002. The songs "Bullet to Binary" and "Gentlemen" were featured on a split album with Norma Jean.

Track listing

"The Cure for Pain" contains an acoustic rendition of "I Never Said That I Was Brave" as a hidden track. The vocal in this song is performed by bassist Daniel Pishock.

References 

2002 debut albums
MewithoutYou albums
Tooth & Nail Records albums